Athina 90 is a futsal club based in Athens, Greece. Ιt was the first futsal club established in Greece and has won more trophies than any other team in Greek futsal, including a record 15 League titles and a record 7 Cups. Only three other teams have won the League title. The club has also participated in UEFA Futsal Cup 14 times.

On 8 August 2017 it was announced that the club would rename under the name "Panathinaikos", having a 5 year agreement with Panathinaikos Multisports Club, that would continue to compete in the top tiers of the local competitions under the new name till 2021-22 season. After this Athina 90 will obtain its previous name.

Colours and crest
Athina 90's colours were green, white and blue and its logo depicts a teenager playing with a ball.

Last squad roster

Honours

References

External links
 Official site
 Club's Profile at the uefa.com

Futsal clubs in Greece
Futsal clubs established in 1990
1990 establishments in Greece